James Henderson Finlayson (27 August 1887 – 9 October 1953) was a Scottish actor who worked in both silent and sound comedies. Bald, with a fake moustache, Finlayson had many trademark comic mannerisms and is known for his squinting, outraged, "double take and fade away" head reaction, and characteristic expression "d'ooooooh", and as the best remembered comic foil of Laurel and Hardy.

Finlayson was known by a variety of nicknames. According to Laurel and Hardy scholar Randy Skretvedt, he "called himself Jimmy, was known around the lot as Jim and is usually referred to today as 'Fin'" –  as a truncated version of his surname, as author John McCabe presented it in his 1961 book biography Mr. Laurel & Mr. Hardy .

Early life and stage career
Born in Larbert, Stirlingshire, Scotland to Alexander and Isabella (née Henderson) Finlayson, James worked as a tinsmith before pursuing an acting career. As part of John Clyde's company, he played the part of Jamie Ratcliffe in Jeanie Deans at the Theatre Royal in Edinburgh in 1910. 

The next year (1911) with both parents deceased, he emigrated (at age 24) to the United States, along with his brother, Robert. In May 1912 in New York City, he played the role of a detective disguised as a teuchter (person originating from the Scottish West Highlands or Western Isles) in the stage production The Great Game at Daly's Theatre: "James Finlayson had an excellent opportunity, which he did not miss, for developing two characters in his one role – the simple, naive Scotsman and the artful, determined detective. The remarkable thing is that he managed to do them both at the same time."

He later won the role of Rab Biggar in the Broadway production of Bunty Pulls the Strings by Graham Moffat, and dropped out of a national tour in 1916 to pursue a career in Hollywood.

Film
Arriving in Los Angeles in 1916, he initially found film work at L-KO and Thomas H. Ince's studio.
In October 1919, he signed a contract with the Mack Sennett Comedies Corporation. He appeared in numerous Sennett-produced comedies, including with the Keystone Kops.

The promotional newspaper article for the 1920 premiere of Sennett's Down on the Farm refers to Finlayson as "legitimate and screen player of international celebrity" and of his performance says: "The  in the case – a sort of cross between a Turkish Don Juan and a 'loan shark' – is played with rare power and comic results of seriousness by James Finlayson".

Finlayson sent to Scotland for his close friend Andy Clyde, urging him to come to America and join Finlayson at the Sennett studio. Clyde arrived in 1922 and became a fixture at Sennett, as a versatile character actor. Finlayson himself, however, did not establish himself as star material and left Sennett's employ later that year.

Hal Roach Studios
Finlayson was hired almost immediately by Sennett's rival, Hal Roach, who gave him supporting roles in his studio's Snub Pollard and Stan Laurel comedies. With Roach's biggest short-subject star Harold Lloyd moving on to features, Roach tried to start new series with Charley Chase (successfully) and James Finlayson (unsuccessfully). The next step came in 1927 when Roach's All-Star Comedy series gave Finlayson equal billing with up-and-coming co-stars Stan Laurel and Oliver Hardy, comedian Edna Marion, and others; some studio publicity even referred to Finlayson, Hardy, and Laurel as a "famous comedy trio." But Roach staff producer and future Academy Award director Leo McCarey recognized the great potential of a Laurel-and-Hardy pairing and began developing their characters and expanding their roles. By the autumn of 1928, Laurel and Hardy had their own starring series while the All-Star Comedy series soldiered on with other comedians. Nonetheless, Finlayson was still "considered by many to be an indispensable part of the Laurel & Hardy team."

Altogether, Finlayson played roles in 33 Laurel and Hardy films, usually as a villain or an antagonist, in such films Big Business (1929) and Way Out West (1937). Beside that, he starred alongside Stan Laurel in 19 films and opposite Oliver Hardy in five films before Laurel and Hardy were teamed together; he appeared in dozens of Roach Studio films, with Charley Chase, Glenn Tryon, Snub Pollard, and Ben Turpin, and in several Our Gang shorts, including Mush and Milk, in which he and Spanky McFarland match wits in a comically adversarial phone conversation.

Finlayson later played uncredited bit parts in films such as Foreign Correspondent (1940), To Be or Not to Be (1942), and Royal Wedding (1951). He was often called upon for silent-comedy reunions like Hollywood Cavalcade (1939)  and The Perils of Pauline (1947).

Personal life and death
He married Emily Cora Gilbert, an American citizen from Iowa, in 1919 and became a US citizen in 1942.

English actress Stephanie Insall and Finlayson regularly took breakfast together.  However, on the morning of 9 October 1953, Finlayson did not turn up at the usual time.  Knowing that he had been ill from flu recently, Insall went to his home where she discovered his body.  Finlayson had died of a heart attack.  He was 66 years old.

Legacy
One of Finlayson's trademarks was a drawn out "dohhhhhhh!" Finlayson had used the term as a minced oath to stand in for the word "Damn!" A half-century later, it inspired Dan Castellaneta, the voice actor of Homer Simpson. During the voice recording session for a Tracey Ullman Show short, Castellaneta was required to utter what was written in the script as an "annoyed grunt". He rendered it as a drawn out "dohhhhhhh". Matt Groening felt that it would better suit the timing of animation if it were spoken faster. Castellaneta then shortened it to a quickly uttered "D'oh!"

Artwork
James (as "Jimmy Finlayson") is incorporated into the Catchphases 1 section of the Comedy Carpet mosaic beside Blackpool Tower along with a "D'OH!" embossed star.

A plaque by the Scottish Film Council honouring James was displayed in Bo'ness Library as part of the HippFest 2019 silent film festival.

Portrayals
James Finlayson is one of the many entertainers portrayed by the English actor Timothy Spall in the 2018 film Stanley: a Man of Variety.

In the 2018 Laurel and Hardy biopic Stan & Ollie, Finlayson is portrayed on the set of Way Out West by Scottish actor Keith MacPherson.

Sons of the Desert Tent
An international "tent" (chapter) of the Sons of the Desert fraternity was formed in Glasgow in 2019 by and for relatives of James Finlayson. It was named Our Relations after the Laurel and Hardy film.

Filmography

References

External links

 
 
 James Finlayson at the Complete Index to World Film
 
 

1887 births
1953 deaths
20th-century Scottish male actors
Alumni of the University of Edinburgh
American male film actors
American male silent film actors
20th-century American male actors
American male stage actors
Hal Roach Studios actors
People from Larbert
People with acquired American citizenship
Scottish emigrants to the United States
Scottish male film actors
Scottish male silent film actors
Scottish male stage actors
Silent film comedians
Scottish male comedians
20th-century Scottish comedians
British male comedy actors
British expatriate male actors in the United States
Our Gang
Laurel and Hardy